Christopher Dean "Chris" Myers is an American author and artist. He has collaborated on a number of children's picture books with his father, Walter Dean Myers. Myers is a recipient of the Coretta Scott King award. Chris Myers published his book "Make Me a World" with Random House.

Education

Myers graduated from Brown University in 1995 with a B.A. in Art-Semiotics and American Civilization, and the Whitney Museum of Art Independent Studio Program in 1996.

Career 
Christopher Myers has exhibited in several locations throughout the world: 

As a solo artist, Drapetomania, Rotherwas Project 5: Christopher Myers, The Red Plague Rid You for Learning Me Your Language, Language, Nobody Is My Name, Flags of No Nations II, Let the Mermaids Flirt With Me, Flags of No Nation, 

And group exhibitions, Desert X Biennial, Walls for a Cause, We Buy Gold in collaboration with Orange Barrel Media, Friend and Foe, Fragmented Bodies, Abortion is Normal, Plumb Line: Charles White and the Contemporary, Fishing for Islands, The Current Convening #2, Shorts Concerning Global Poverty, Prospect.3: Notes for Now, Ghost Effect in Real Time, Greater New York, Curious Crystals of Unusual Purity.

In 2021 he also participated in Caliban’s Hands, Monumental Tour at  Kindred Arts and Phila Parks and Recreation, Shakespeare Park, in Philadelphia.

Recognitions 
Myers has become the recipient of awards, honors, and residences like Colene Brown Art Prize 2019, Art for Justice Fund Grant 2018, Yerba Buena Center for the Arts 100 List in 2018, Coretta Scott King Illustrator Award for Firebird in 2016, CCBC Choices 2015, My Pen, Cooperative Children’s Book Center, Coretta Scott King Award 2015 – ALA, Firebird, First National Bank of Omaha Award for Outstanding Service to Public Education 2015, San Art Laboratory Residency 2013, Coretta Scott King Illustrator Honor for Jazz 2007, Boston Globe-Horn Book Honor for Blues Journey 2006, National Book Award finalist for Autobiography of My Dead Brother 2005, National Book Award finalist, Monster 2005 Coretta Scott King Illustrator Honor for Black Cat 2000 Caldecott Honor for Harlem 1998.

Theater 
In 2017 Myers wrote and designed Cartography, a play directed by Kaneza Schaal, The Center for the Arts, Wesleyan University, Middletown, at the John F., Kennedy Center for the Performing Arts, and performed in Washington, D.C., The Arts Center at NYU Abu Dhabi, Hamburger Bahnhof, Berlin, Germany. In 2018 Christopher Myers wrote and designed JACK, a play directed by Kaneza Schaal, Brooklyn Academy of Music.

Fine Art 

In 2018 Christopher Myer’s designed imagery from the life and experiences of Vaslav Nijinsky, which were then crafted by Indonesian puppet makers for Fire in the Head, Displayed at the SCAD Museum, display used Billboards to highlight refugee crisis around the globe at the Center for Maine Contemporary Art for Every Refugee Boat is a Mayflower, installation at Fort Gansevoort that included the pieces I Am Not a Human Being, VXLLRNCGNT, and The Boats called Let the Mermaids Flirt With Me.

IN 2016, he displayed at Cooper Gallery alongside work by Pollock, Warhol and Billie Holiday. This exhibit explored the intersection of Jazz and visual art. Myers created brass instruments reflective of those used in Saigon and New Orleans funeral marches, Echo in the Bones, Go Forth, 

Myers designed theatrical set pieces for an adapted from the Egyptian Book of the Dead, directed by Kaneza Schaal and performed at the Coil Festival.

In 2014, he worked on a short documentary film which explores the transformation of Kenya through the impact of technology. Myers co-directed and the film was submitted for the Sundance Short Film Challenge, Am I Going Too Fast? 

In 2000, Chris Myers' All-Negro Freakshow project humanized Black American sideshow performers through archived photos and correspondences, displayed at Vassar.

References

External links 

 Interview with cunytv
 Interview with Kennedy Center Education Digital Learning
 Interview with Reading Rockets
 Christopher Myers at Library of Congress Authorities, with 21 catalog records

African-American artists
American children's book illustrators
Living people
21st-century African-American people
1974 births
20th-century African-American people